The Conestogo River is a river in Waterloo Region and Wellington County in Southwestern Ontario, Canada. The river was named by Mennonite settlers after the Conestoga River in Pennsylvania. In the 1800s there were several different spellings of the name of the river and of the nearby settlement of Conestogo, Ontario but the name ending in "o" became official.

It is in the Lake Erie Basin and joins the Grand River as a right tributary at the community of Conestogo.

A conservation area operated by the Grand River Conservation Authority is located on this lake.

Natural history
Fish species in the river include brown trout, pike, smallmouth bass, perch, walleye and carp.

See also
List of rivers of Ontario

References

Sources

Rivers of the Regional Municipality of Waterloo
Rivers of Wellington County, Ontario
Tributaries of the Grand River (Ontario)
Wellesley, Ontario